Sinclairia is a genus of Latin American plants in the tribe Liabeae within the family Asteraceae.

 Species
 Sinclairia adenotricha (Greenm.) Rydb. - Oaxaca
 Sinclairia andrieuxii (DC.) H.Rob. & Brettell - Oaxaca, Chiapas, Guatemala
 Sinclairia andromachioides (Less.) Sch.Bip. ex Rydb. - Veracruz
 Sinclairia angustissima (A.Gray) B.L.Turner - Jalisco
 Sinclairia broomae H.Rob. - Guerrero
 Sinclairia caducifolia (B.L.Rob. & Bartlett) Rydb. - Guerrero
 Sinclairia cervina (B.L.Rob.) B.L.Turner - Jalisco
 Sinclairia deamii (B.L.Rob. & Bartlett) Rydb. - Tabasco, Chiapas, Yucatán Peninsula, Central America
 Sinclairia deppeana (Less.) Rydb. - Oaxaca
 Sinclairia dimidia (S.F.Blake) H.Rob. & Brettell - Chiapas, Guatemala
 Sinclairia discolor Hook. & Arn. - from Panamá to Jalisco
 Sinclairia gentryi (H.Rob.) B.L.Turner - Nayarit
 Sinclairia glabra (Hemsl.) Rydb. - from Oaxaca to Nicaragua
 Sinclairia hintoniorum B.L.Turner - México State
 Sinclairia hypochlora (S.F.Blake) Rydb. - Chiapas, Guatemala
 Sinclairia ismaelis Panero & Villaseñor - Oaxaca
 Sinclairia klattii (B.L.Rob. & Greenm.) H.Rob. & Brettell - Oaxaca, Guerrero, Veracruz
 Sinclairia liebmannii (Klatt) Sch.Bip. ex Rydb. - Oaxaca
 Sinclairia manriquei Panero & Villaseñor - Oaxaca
 Sinclairia moorei (H.Rob. & Brettell) H.Rob. & Brettell - Oaxaca
 Sinclairia palmeri (A.Gray) B.L.Turner - Durango
 Sinclairia platylepis (Sch.Bip. ex Sch.Bip.) Rydb.
 Sinclairia polyantha (Klatt) Rydb. - from Oaxaca to Colombia
 Sinclairia pringlei (B.L.Rob. & Greenm.) H.Rob. & Brettell - Jalisco, Nayarit
 Sinclairia sericolepis (Hemsl.) Rydb. - Chiapas, Oaxaca, Tabasco, Veracruz
 Sinclairia similis (McVaugh) H.Rob. & Brettell - Jalisco
 Sinclairia sublobata (B.L.Rob.) Rydb. - from Oaxaca to Nicaragua
 Sinclairia tajumulcensis (Standl. & Steyerm.) H.Rob. & Brettell - Guatemala
 Sinclairia vagans (S.F.Blake) H.Rob. & Brettell - Chiapas, Guatemala

References

Asteraceae genera
Liabeae